Royal Pier may refer to:

Royal Pier, Southampton
Royal Pier, Aberystwyth
Royal Suspension Chain Pier